"Check It Out" is a 1987 song by John Mellencamp released as the third single from his album The Lonesome Jubilee in 1988. The single was a top 20 hit, reaching number 14 on the Billboard Hot 100.

Lyrics and music
According to Mellencamp biographer David Masciotra, the song "describes the rewards and punishments of a typical American middle-class family" and professes that "our attempts to solve the mysteries of the heart and grasp the truth of humanity are fraught with disaster and disappointment."  Mellencamp biographer Paul Rees called its sound "uplifting".

Reception
Cash Box said that Mellencamp's rough county-ish feel takes you into the heartland [of America]" and that the song "features a nice instrumental hook line that sounds like an otherworldly bagpipe and leads into the verses."

Masciotra calls it "a uniquely powerful testament to the mystery of inner life.

Music video
The video was shot in one of the poorest areas of the deep South.

Charts

Weekly charts

References

1987 songs
1988 singles
John Mellencamp songs
Song recordings produced by Don Gehman
Songs written by John Mellencamp
Mercury Records singles